The 2020–21 season was the 81st season in the existence of SD Eibar and the club's seventh consecutive season in the top flight of Spanish football. In addition to the domestic league, Eibar participated in this season's edition of the Copa del Rey. The season covered the period from 20 July 2020 to 30 June 2021, with the late start to the season due to the COVID-19 pandemic in Spain.

Players

First-team squad

Out on loan

Youth squad

Transfers

In

 2,000,000 €

Out

 1,400,000 €

Pre-season and friendlies

Competitions

Overall record

La Liga

League table

Results summary

Results by round

Matches
The league fixtures were announced on 31 August 2020.

Copa del Rey

Squad statistics
Last updated on 1 February 2021

Notes

References

External links

SD Eibar seasons
SD Eibar